Skin window technique is used in immunology where the top layer of skin is scraped off making it possible to identify the immune response that would occur with a diminished physical barrier in the host, and observe mobilization of leukocytes.

It was developed by John Rebuck in 1955.

References

External links
 

Dermatologic procedures